Lechytia is a genus of pseudoscorpions in the subfamily Lechytiinae within the family Chthoniidae. It is the sole genus in its subfamily and contains 22 described species from many parts of the world.

Species
 Lechytia anatolica Beier, 1965 — Turkey
 Lechytia arborea Muchmore, 1975 — Florida, Texas
 Lechytia asiatica Redikorzev, 1938 — Vietnam
 Lechytia cavicola Muchmore, 1973 — Mexico
 Lechytia chilensis Beier, 1964 — Chile
 Lechytia chthoniiformis (Balzan, 1887) — South America
 Lechytia delamarei Vitali-di Castro, 1984 — Guadeloupe
 Lechytia dentata Mahnert, 1978 — Republic of Congo
 Lechytia garambica Beier, 1972 — Democratic Republic of Congo
 Lechytia himalayana Beier, 1974 — Nepal
 Lechytia hoffi Muchmore, 1975 — western USA
 Lechytia indica Murthy & Ananthakrishnan, 1977 — India
 Lechytia kuscheli Beier, 1957 — Juan Fernández Islands
 Lechytia leleupi Beier, 1959 — Democratic Republic of Congo
 Lechytia madrasica Sivaraman, 1980 — India
 Lechytia martiniquensis Vitali-di Castro, 1984 — Martinique
 Lechytia maxima Beier, 1955 — Kenya, Tanzania
 Lechytia natalensis (Tullgren, 1907) — southern Africa
 Lechytia sakagamii Morikawa, 1952 — Caroline Islands
 Lechytia serrulata Beier, 1955 — Democratic Republic of Congo
 Lechytia sini Muchmore, 1975 — Florida, Texas
 † Lechytia tertiaria Schawaller, 1980 — fossil: Dominican amber
 Lechytia trinitatis Beier, 1970

Footnotes

References
 Joel Hallan's Biology Catalog: Lechytiidae

Further reading
  (1975): The Genus Lechytia in the United States (Pseudoscorpionida, Chthoniidae). The Southwestern Naturalist 20(1): 13-27. 

Pseudoscorpion genera
Chthonioidea